Waurika Lake is a reservoir in southwestern Oklahoma, near Waurika. It is primarily in Jefferson County, but small parts of it are in Stephens County and Cotton County, Oklahoma. Its primary purposes are to provide flood control, irrigation, water supply, water quality, fish and wildlife, recreation, and other conservation needs of the public. The lake supplies water for the cities of Lawton, Duncan, Comanche, Temple, and Waurika.

Continued operation of the lake water pumping system is being jeopardized by a buildup of silt near the water intake. The extremely hot summers of 2011-2013 have caused excessive evaporation of lake water and unusually high consumption by communities that use the water. Water officials estimated that pumping may have had to cease in April 2015, unless corrective actions could be taken soon, although an extremely rainy storm season in May of that year raised the lake levels to 90.36% capacity.

Description

Construction of Waurika Dam began in 1963, with completion of the project occurring in 1980.

Environmental issues
Prolonged drought in southwestern Oklahoma during 2011 – 12 has caused serious harm to the lake. Water conservation steps, including severe restrictions on lawn watering and higher customer fees, have been implemented by the cities who consume the lake water.  Evaporation losses have been high, and there are concerns about the increased rate of silting. Drought conditions are also conducive to the formation of harmful algae.

2011 Algae bloom
During August 2011, the Oklahoma Department of Environmental Quality found high concentrations of blue-green algae in lake water samples and banned human contact with untreated lake water. This algae contains toxins that are very hazardous to humans.  In response, the Corps of Engineers shut down the two swimming beaches there. By late December algae concentrations had dropped sufficiently to lift the ban, although the agencies were still discouraging water contact.

2013 Silt accumulation
In June 2013, an Oklahoma Water Resources Board study disclosed that a build-up of clay and dirt had accumulated close to the water pump intake. This was the result of high evaporation rates and high water consumption.

Water officials have called for mandatory 10 percent reductions in the supply to users as one way to extend the life of the system. Dredging the sediment is also being considered. Removing the accumulated material is expected to cost between $2.5 and $6 million. The dredging project could begin in 2014, but funding must be found first.

Officials also pointed out that the current low levels of lake water present additional safety hazards for lake users. Low levels are exposing old trees, bridge piers and other obstacles. The water has low visibility and there are a lot of dropoffs in the bottom.

References

Reservoirs in Oklahoma
Protected areas of Oklahoma
Buildings and structures completed in 1980
Bodies of water of Jefferson County, Oklahoma